Mangelia dubia is an extinct species of sea snail, a marine gastropod mollusk in the family Mangeliidae.

This is not  Mangelia dubia (C. B. Adams, 1845) (synonym of Tenaturris dubia (C. B. Adams, 1845)) (preoccupied by Pleurotoma dubia Cristofori & Jan, 1832)

Distribution
This extinct marine species was found in Pliocene strata in Suffolk, UK.

References

External links
 C.O. van Regteren Altena; A. Bloklander & L.P. Pouderoyen, De fossiele schelpen van de Nederlandse stranden en zeegaten, 5; Basteria, vol 25 (1961) nr. 1 p. 3-6

dubia
Gastropods described in 1919